Streptomyces burgazadensis is a bacterium species from the genus of Streptomyces which has been isolated from soil from the Marmara Sea in Burgazada in Istanbul in Turkey.

See also 
 List of Streptomyces species

References

Further reading

External links
Type strain of Streptomyces burgazadensis at BacDive – the Bacterial Diversity Metadatabase

burgazadensis
Bacteria described in 2014